Anderson Paredes Gálvez (born 27 March 1984) is a Colombian football defender.

Career
Born in Cali, Paredes began playing football with youth sides of Deportivo Cali. He joined the senior sides of Deportivo Pereira, Deportivo Pasto and Depor F.C., but he suffered four knee injuries which hampered his career. However, by 2009, he had recovered and joined the senior side of Deportivo Cali.

See also
Football in Colombia
List of football clubs in Colombia

References

External links
 BDFA profile

1984 births
Living people
Footballers from Cali
Colombian footballers
Deportivo Pereira footballers
Deportivo Pasto footballers
Atlético F.C. footballers
Deportivo Cali footballers
Association football forwards